Nadezhdino is a rural locality (a village) in Chertkovskoye Rural Settlement, Selivanovsky District, Vladimir Oblast, Russia. The population was 165 as of 2010. There are 4 streets.

Geography 
Nadezhdino is located on the Tetrukh River, 21 km northeast of Krasnaya Gorbatka (the district's administrative centre) by road. Chernovskaya is the nearest rural locality.

References 

Rural localities in Selivanovsky District